Kim Yeong-hyeon (The romanization preferred by the author according to LTI Korea) is a modern Korean poet, novelist and publisher.

Personal life
Like many intellectuals of the time, Kim was the target of oppression during the 30 years of dictatorship after partition. In 1977, Kim was in college when he was arrested for his participation in a student movement. When he was released from prison after serving a two-year sentence, Kim was inducted into the Korean Amy.

Work 
At the end of the 1980s Kim and other writers published so-called “after-the-fact” stories exposing the atrocities committed by the military dictatorship. His first collection of short stories entitled A Deep River Flows Far was a product of the author's experience. Kim also served as the publisher of Silcheonmunhak, a popular literary quarterly.

Although “after-the-fact” stories diminished in popularity over the years, Kim continued to write about the people who have suffered, fought and perished under political oppression. Kim claimed that we do not talk about the past because we ourselves have changed over time and have simply forgotten. For him, the past is the very foundation of the life we have now.

Kim's books are a testament to his stubborn engagement with the events of modern Korean history. Kim believes that literature is grounded, created and manifested in reality; and only as such, can it attain the power to heal wounded souls.

Works in Korean (partial) 
Short story collections:
 A Deep River Flows Far (1990)
 The Road to Haenam (1992)
Novels
  Young Lord (1993)
 Heavy Snow (2002)
Poetry Collections
 Winter Sea (1988)
 A South Sea Postcard (1994)
Children's Books
 Adventure of Ttolgae (2000)

References

1955 births
Korean writers
Living people
People from Changnyeong County